Best Deal TV is a Hindi-language 24/7 home shopping television channel, owned by Akshay Kumar and Raj Kundra. The channel is a free-to-air and launched on 18 March 2015. The channel is available across all major cable and DTH platforms as well as online. The channel is India's first celebrity-driven TV Commerce channel.

References

Hindi-language television channels in India
Television channels and stations established in 2015
Hindi-language television stations
Television stations in Mumbai
2015 establishments in Maharashtra